is a Japanese mathematician working in number theory, especially analytic number theory, multiple trigonometric function theory, zeta functions and automorphic forms. He is currently a professor emeritus at Tokyo Institute of Technology.

Books
 with Shin-ya Koyama, 多重三角関数論講義 (Lectures on multiple sine functions), 2010. Lectures notes originally from April–July 1991 at University of Tokyo.
 with Shinya Koyama, Absolute Mathematics, 2010. (Japanese)
 Pursuit of the Riemann Hypothesis: ABC to Z, 2012. (Japanese)
 Beyond the Riemann Hypothesis: Deep Riemann Hypothesis (DRH), 2013. (Japanese)
 Modern trigonometric function theory, 2013. (Japanese)
 Principles of Absolute Mathematics, 2016. (Japanese)
 The World of Absolute Mathematics: Riemann Hypothesis, Langlands conjecture, Sato conjecture, 2017. (Japanese)
 with Shinya Koyama, Introduction to the ABC conjecture, 2018. (Japanese)

References

External links
 Journey to the world of absolute mathematics at Tokyo Institute of Technology, March 28, 2017 (video)

20th-century Japanese mathematicians
21st-century Japanese mathematicians
1952 births
Living people